Tomás Carbonell and Christian Miniussi were the defending champions, but Miniussi did not compete this year. Carbonell teamed up with Goran Prpić and lost in the first round to Mikael Pernfors and Nicklas Utgren.

Henrik Holm and Anders Järryd won the title by defeating Brian Devening and Tomas Nydahl 6–1, 3–6, 6–3 in the final.

Seeds

Draw

Draw

References

External links
 Official results archive (ATP)
 Official results archive (ITF)

Doubles